Vincent Beck (August 15, 1924 – July 24, 1984) was an American character actor who began his career as on stage. He was also a prolific film and television actor who acted in films such as Santa Claus Conquers the Martians (1964), The Spy in the Green Hat  (1967), The Scorpio Letters (1967), The Pink Jungle (1968), The Bamboo Saucer (1968) and Vigilante (1983). He also appeared in numerous television shows including The Monkees,  Get Smart, Daniel Boone, The Man from U.N.C.L.E., Bonanza,  The Time Tunnel, and Lost in Space.

Background
A prolific actor, he became recognized for his roles in on film early in his career. A portion of the television roles in his career consisted of villains, aliens and other interesting characters. From 1982, he was third vice president of Actors Equity. He was also president of the New York branch of the Screen Actors Guild, having held that position since 1983.

Stage
In 1946, he appeared on Broadway in A Flag Is Born on Broadway which marked his stage debut. Other stage roles included The World of Sholom Aleichem, The Merchant of Venice, Oliver, Irma la Douce, Gypsy and Bells Are Ringing.

In 1950, Beck was appearing as The Young Covey in the Sean O'Casey play, The Plough and the Stars which had been playing at the Hudson Guild Theater since Jan 30th. Along with Sy Travers and Osna Palmer, Beck was noted by The Billboard reviewer Dennis McDonald for his fine performance. In April, he appeared  in James Barrie's Peter Pan which had been playing at the Imperial Theater in New York since the  24th of that month. Beck was playing the part of Whibbles. In April 1951, he was playing the part of Teddy in the Clifford Odets comedy, Night Music, which had been playing at the ANTA Playhouse. Rod Steiger was also in the play.

In 1955, he appeared in the musical, Almost Crazy, which played at the Longacre Theater from June 20, 1955 to July 2.

In early 1965,  Beck was playing the part of the evil Bill Sikes in the stage production Oliver. The reviewer in The Des Moines Register said he was "properly menacing as the all-time bad guy Sikes".

Film and television career

1960s
Becks earliest film role was that of the evil Martian leader Voldar in the 1964 film Santa Claus Conquers the Martians which was directed by Nicholas Webster.  In 1965 he appeared on Gilligan's Island (S2/EP9 - as Russian cosmonaut Igor), in the Anybody Got a Zebra? episode of Mister Ed as Krona.  He played the part of Benjamin Luger in  The Man from U.N.C.L.E. film The Spy in the Green Hat which was released in 1967. He played the part of Zagorsky in the Frank Telford directed sci-fi film The Bamboo Saucer which was released in 1968.

1970s to 1980s
Beck appeared as Kevin Archer in an episode of Mannix in which Joe Mannix is targeted by a crime boss who thinks he knows too much about a missing corpse. The episode aired on January 30, 1971. Later that year Beck appeared in another episode of Mannix as Frankie West in Catspaw. The following year, he was in Mission Impossible as Bolt in the Double Dead episode which aired on 12 February 1972. The following year he was in The Magician, a series that starred Bill Bixby. The episode he appeared in was The Manhunters in which played the part of Stanley Owens. It aired on October 2, 1973. He appeared in  The F.B.I. in the Deadly Ambition episode which aired in 1974 and the another episode of Mannix, Hardball which aired the following year in 1975. He played the part of Trilling in the Michael Winner directed 1979 film, Firepower which starred Sophia Loren and James Coburn.

His last acting role was that of the corrupt Judge Sinclair in the William Lustig directed Vigilante. A film about an average man who becomes a vigilante after his wife and young son are murdered by a street gang. It also starred Fred Williamson, Robert Forster, Joe Spinnell and Woody Strode. It was released in 1983. Judge Sinclair has obviously got a share in the bribe-money which lawyer Einsberg (Played by Joe Spinnell) has received from the gang and the killers basically walk free.

Death
Beck died at age 59 of cancer at his Manhattan home in July 1984.

Filmography

References

External links
 Imdb: Vincet Beck
 Ibdb: Vincent Beck
 Broadway World: Vincent Beck
 Aveleyman: Vincent Beck
 The Scott Rollins Film and TV Trivia: Vincent Beck

1924 births
1984 deaths
20th-century American male actors
American male film actors
American male stage actors
Deaths from cancer in New York (state)